Albert Johnson III (born November 11, 1977) is a former Canadian Football League player for the Winnipeg Blue Bombers. Johnson played his college football for Southern Methodist University and then signed with the Saskatchewan Roughriders where he played three games in 1999. Johnson then signed with the Blue Bombers and went on to win the league's Rookie of the Year Award in 2000 after leading the league in return yardage. He signed with the Texans but suffered injuries throughout his National Football League stint. In 2006 Johnson returned to the Blue Bombers and once again led the CFL in return yardage and was second in combined yards to teammate Charles Roberts.

Johnson was released in January 2008 as the Bombers sought to reduce their payroll to meet the salary cap and was not picked up by any other team.

References 

1977 births
Living people
Canadian football return specialists
Cologne Centurions (NFL Europe) players
Players of American football from Houston
Players of Canadian football from Houston
Saskatchewan Roughriders players
SMU Mustangs football players
Winnipeg Blue Bombers players
Canadian Football League Rookie of the Year Award winners
Miami Dolphins players